The King's Choice (meaning "The King's No") is a 2016 biographical war film directed by Erik Poppe. It is a co-production of Norway, Sweden, Denmark, and Ireland, and was selected as the Norwegian entry for the Best Foreign Language Film at the 89th Academy Awards. The film made the shortlist of nine films to be considered for a nomination at the 89th Academy Awards.

Plot 
The film focuses on King Haakon VII and the Norwegian Royal Family in the days before and immediately after the German invasion of Norway in April 1940.

On 8 April, Crown Prince Olav informs his father that the transport ship that was sunk off Lillesand earlier that day was carrying German soldiers, and expresses concern that the government of Prime Minister Johan Nygaardsvold refuses to give up Norway's neutrality in the face of German aggression. At the German embassy in Oslo, German envoy Curt Bräuer is instructed by military attaché Lieutenant-Colonel Hartwig Pohlman to encourage the Norwegian government to allow German troops into the country, under the pretext of defending Norway from a British invasion. Early the following morning, Bräuer takes the German offer to Foreign Minister Halvdan Koht; after consulting the Cabinet, Koht refuses, stating that Norway is a sovereign nation.

Meanwhile, at Oscarsborg Fortress near Drøbak, Colonel Birger Eriksen prepares his undermanned and inexperienced garrison for combat, while receiving reports from the outlying fortresses of incoming German ships. Early on the morning of 9 April, Eriksen spots the German cruiser Blücher entering Drøbak Sound. Despite having received no instructions from Oslo to engage, Eriksen considers the German ship to be hostile and gives the order to fire, and the fortress's guns and torpedo battery sink the Blücher. Prime Minister Nygaardsvold telephones the King, informing him of the impending invasion, and advises him to flee Oslo. The Royal Family boards a train for Hamar, where the Norwegian Parliament convenes to discuss negotiations with Germany. Bräuer meets Oslo's police chief Kristian Welhaven, his intermediary with the Norwegian Cabinet, to reassure them of his desire to negotiate; at the same time, Pohlman receives orders from Berlin to send paratroopers to Hamar to capture the King and the Cabinet. Nasjonal Samling leader Vidkun Quisling proclaims himself Prime Minister over the national radio, and calls upon the Norwegian people to accept the German occupation forces. Bräuer receives instructions from Hitler himself to go directly to the King and convince him to recognise Quisling's government, though Bräuer is convinced that neither Haakon nor the Cabinet will accept this.

As German troops advance towards Hamar, the Royal Family and the Cabinet relocate to Elverum, where the decision is made to send Olav's wife and three children to Sweden while the King and the Crown Prince remain in the country. Just after midnight on 10 April, the German paratroopers attack a roadblock at Midtskogen, and are beaten back by the Norwegian volunteers. At Nybergsund, the Cabinet meets to discuss Bräuer's request to meet the King alone to end the hostilities. Despite Olav's objections and fears for his father's safety, Haakon agrees to meet with Bräuer at Elverum. Bräuer urges Haakon to follow the example of his elder brother, King Christian of Denmark, to capitulate without further resistance. Haakon relays the German demands to the Cabinet and states he cannot accept Quisling as Prime Minister, offering to abdicate if the Cabinet felt otherwise. Inspired by the King's decision, the Cabinet informs Bräuer of their refusal. In response, German aircraft bomb Elverum and Nybergsund, forcing Haakon and the Cabinet to flee into the woods.

The King, the Crown Prince, and the Cabinet eventually escape to Britain, where they remain until the end of the war. In May 1945, following the German surrender, Haakon is reunited with his grandson, Prince Harald, in London before the Royal Family returns to Norway.

Cast

 Jesper Christensen as King Haakon VII
 Anders Baasmo Christiansen as Crown Prince Olav
 Tuva Novotny as Crown Princess Märtha
 Katharina Schüttler as Anneliese Bräuer
 Karl Markovics as Curt Bräuer
 Juliane Köhler as Diana Müller
 Erik Hivju as Colonel Birger Eriksen
 Espen Sandvik as Captain Magnus P. Sødem
 Arthur Hakalahti as Guardsman Fredrik Seeberg
 Rolf Kristian Larsen as Sergeant Brynjar Hammer
 Svein Tindberg as Peder Anker Wedel Jarlsberg
 Gerald Pettersen as Prime Minister Johan Nygaardsvold
 Ketil Høegh as Foreign Minister Halvdan Koht
 Andreas Lust as Oberstleutnant Hartwig Pohlman
 Jan Frostad as President of the Storting C. J. Hambro
 Magnus Ketil Dobbe as Prince Harald
 Sofie Falkgård as Princess Ragnhild
 Ingrid Ross Raftemo as Princess Astrid
 Udo Schenk as Adolf Hitler (voice)
 Torfinn Nag as Police Chief Kristian Welhaven
 Jan Petter Dickman as Ivar Lykke

Release
The film was first shown to the whole of the present Norwegian royal family at the Royal Palace in Oslo on 16 September 2016.

Reception
On Rotten Tomatoes, the film has an approval rating of 83% based on reviews from 24 critics. On Metacritic, the film has a score of 64 out of 100, based on reviews from 8 critics.

See also
 List of submissions to the 89th Academy Awards for Best Foreign Language Film
 List of Norwegian submissions for the Academy Award for Best Foreign Language Film

Historic background
 Sinking of the troopship off Lillesand
 Battle of Drøbak Sound
 Battle of Midtskogen
 Elverum Authorization
 Bombardment of Nybergsund
 Timeline of the Norwegian Campaign

References

External links
 
 The King's Choice Trailer on IMDb
 
 The King's Choice at Palace Films and Cinemas
 The King's Choice at Palm Springs International Film Festival

2016 films
2016 multilingual films
2016 war drama films
2016 biographical drama films
Norwegian drama films
Norwegian biographical films
Films directed by Erik Poppe
Irish biographical drama films
Norwegian-language films
2010s Danish-language films
2010s German-language films
Films set in Norway
Films shot in Norway
Western Front of World War II films
World War II films based on actual events
Cultural depictions of Norwegian kings
Norwegian multilingual films
Swedish multilingual films
Danish multilingual films
Irish multilingual films